The following lists events that happened during 2009 in Laos.

Incumbents
President: Choummaly Sayasone
Vice President:  Bounnhang Vorachith
Prime Minister: Bouasone Bouphavanh

Events
date unknown - 2009 Lao League

December
December - 2009 Southeast Asian Games
28 December - Thailand begins repatriating 4,000 Hmong to Laos against their will, despite international protest. The repatriation is completed the next day.

References

 
Years of the 21st century in Laos
Laos
2000s in Laos
Laos